Crambidia myrlosea is a moth of the family Erebidae. It was described by Harrison Gray Dyar Jr. in 1917. It is found from the US states of New Mexico, Texas and Arizona, south to Belize.

References

Lithosiina
Moths described in 1917